The cookiecutter shark (Isistius brasiliensis), also called the cigar shark, is a species of small squaliform shark in the family Dalatiidae. It migrates vertically up to  every day, approaching the surface at dusk and descending with the dawn. Reaching only  in length, the cookiecutter shark has a long, cylindrical body with a short, blunt snout, large eyes, two tiny spineless dorsal fins, and a large caudal fin. It is dark brown, with light-emitting photophores covering its underside except for a dark "collar" around its throat and gill slits.

The name "cookiecutter shark" refers to its feeding habit of gouging round plugs, as if cut out with a cookie cutter, out of larger animals. Marks made by cookiecutter sharks have been found on a wide variety of marine mammals and fishes, as well as on submarines, undersea cables, and even human bodies. It also consumes whole smaller prey such as squid. Cookiecutter sharks have adaptations for hovering in the water column and likely rely on stealth and subterfuge to capture more active prey. Its dark collar seems to mimic the silhouette of a small fish, while the rest of its body blends into the downwelling light via its ventral photophores. When a would-be predator approaches the lure, the shark attaches itself using its suctorial lips and specialized pharynx and neatly excises a chunk of flesh using its bandsaw-like set of lower teeth. This species has been known to travel in schools.

Though rarely encountered because of its oceanic habitat, a handful of documented attacks on humans were apparently caused by cookiecutter sharks. Nevertheless, this diminutive shark is not regarded as dangerous to humans. The International Union for Conservation of Nature  has listed the cookiecutter shark under least concern, as it is widely distributed, has no commercial value, and is not particularly susceptible to fisheries.

Taxonomy
French naturalists Jean René Constant Quoy and Joseph Paul Gaimard originally described the cookiecutter shark during the 1817–1820 exploratory voyage of the corvette Uranie under Louis de Freycinet, giving it the name Scymnus brasiliensis because the type specimen was caught off Brazil. In 1824, their account was published as part of Voyage autour du monde...sur les corvettes de S.M. l'Uranie et la Physicienne, Louis de Freycinet's 13 volume report on the voyage. In 1865, American ichthyologist Theodore Nicholas Gill coined the new genus Isistius for this species, after Isis, the Egyptian goddess of light.

One of the earliest accounts of the wounds left by the cookiecutter shark on various animals is in ancient Samoan legend, which held that atu (skipjack tuna) entering Palauli Bay would leave behind pieces of their flesh as a sacrifice to Tautunu, the community chief. In later centuries, various other explanations for the wounds were advanced, including lampreys, bacteria, and invertebrate parasites. In 1971, Everet Jones of the U.S. Bureau of Commercial Fisheries (a predecessor of the National Marine Fisheries Service) discovered the cigar shark, as the cookiecutter shark was then generally known, was responsible. Shark expert Stewart Springer thus popularized the name "cookiecutter shark" for this species (though he originally called them "demon whale-biters"). Other common names used for this shark include luminous shark, smalltooth cookiecutter shark, and smooth cookiecutter shark.

Description
The cookiecutter shark has an elongated, cigar-shaped body with a short, bulbously rounded snout. The nostrils have a very short flap of skin in front. The large, oval, green eyes are placed forward on the head, though not so that binocular vision is extensive. Behind the eyes are large spiracles, positioned on the upper surface of the head.

The mouth is short, forming a nearly transverse line, and is surrounded by enlarged, fleshy, suctorial lips. About 30–37 tooth rows are in the upper jaw and 25–31 tooth rows are in the lower jaw, increasing with body size. The upper and lower teeth are extremely different; the upper teeth are small, narrow, and upright, tapering to a single, smooth-edged cusp. The lower teeth are also smooth-edged, but much larger, broader, and knife-like, with their bases interlocking to form a single saw-like cutting edge. The five pairs of gill slits are small.

The pectoral fins are short and roughly trapezoidal in shape. Two spineless dorsal fins are placed far back on the body, the first originating just ahead of the pelvic fins and the second located just behind. The second dorsal fin is slightly larger than the first, and the pelvic fins are larger than either. The anal fin is absent. The caudal fin is broad, with the lower lobe almost as large as the upper, which has a prominent ventral notch. The dermal denticles are squarish and flattened, with a slight central concavity and raised corners. The cookiecutter shark is chocolate brown in color, becoming subtly lighter below, and a dark "collar" wraps around the gill region.

The fins have translucent margins, except for the caudal fin, which has a darker margin. Complex, light-producing organs called photophores densely cover the entire underside, except for the collar, and produce a vivid green glow.

Distribution and habitat
In the Atlantic, it has been reported off the Bahamas and southern Brazil in the west, Cape Verde, Guinea to Sierra Leone, southern Angola, and South Africa in the east, and Ascension Island in the south. In the Indo-Pacific region, it has been caught from Mauritius to New Guinea, Australia, and New Zealand, including Tasmania and Lord Howe Island, as well as off Japan. In the central and eastern Pacific, it occurs from Fiji north to the Hawaiian Islands, and east to the Galápagos, Easter, and Guadalupe Islands. Fresh wounds observed on marine mammals suggest this shark may range as far as California in warm years.

Based on catch records, the cookiecutter shark appears to conduct a diel vertical migration up to  each way. This species may be more tolerant of low dissolved oxygen levels than sharks in the related genera Euprotomicrus and Squaliolus. It is frequently found near islands, perhaps for reproductive purposes or because they hold congregations of large prey animals. In the northeastern Atlantic, most adults are found between 11°N and 16°N, with the smallest and largest individuals being found in lower and higher latitudes, respectively. There is no evidence of sex segregation.

Biology and ecology

Best known for biting neat round chunks of tissue from marine mammals and large fish, the cookiecutter shark is considered a facultative ectoparasite, as it also wholly ingests smaller prey. It has a wide gape and a very strong bite, by virtue of heavily calcified cranial and labial cartilages. With small fins and weak muscles, this ambush predator spends much of its time hovering in the water column. To maintain neutral buoyancy, its liver, which can comprise some 35% of its weight, is rich in low-density lipids. As this species has higher skeletal density than Euprotomicrus or Squaliolus, its body cavity and liver are proportionately much larger, and the oil content is much higher. Its large caudal fin allows for a quick burst of speed to catch larger, faster prey that come in range.

The cookiecutter shark regularly replaces its teeth like other sharks, but sheds its lower teeth in entire rows rather than one at a time. This represents a significant investment of resources and is probably why the shark swallows its old sets of teeth, so that it can recycle the calcium content. Unlike other sharks, the retina of the cookiecutter shark has ganglion cells concentrated in a concentric area rather than in a horizontal streak across the visual field; this may help to focus on prey in front of the shark. This fat shark has been known to travel in schools, which may increase the effectiveness of its lure (see below), as well as discourage counterattacks by much larger predators.

Bioluminescence

The intrinsic green luminescence of the cookiecutter shark is the strongest known of any shark, and has been reported to persist for three hours after it has been taken out of water. The ventrally positioned photophores serve to disrupt its silhouette from below by matching the downwelling light, a strategy known as counter-illumination, that is common among bioluminescent organisms of the mesopelagic zone. The individual photophores are set around the denticles and are small enough that they cannot be discerned by the naked eye, suggesting they have evolved to fool animals with high visual acuity and/or at close distances.

Set apart from the glowing underside, the darker, nonluminescent collar tapers at both sides of the throat, and has been hypothesized to serve as a lure by mimicking the silhouette of a small fish from below. The appeal of the lure would be multiplied in a school of sharks. If the collar does function in this way, the cookiecutter shark would be the only known case of bioluminescence in which the absence of light attracts prey, while its photophores serve to prevent premature detection by incoming would-be predators. As the shark can only match a limited range of light intensities, its vertical movements likely serve to preserve the effectiveness of its disguise across various times of day and weather conditions.

Feeding

Virtually every type of medium- to large-sized oceanic animal sharing the habitat of the cookiecutter shark is open to attack; bite scars have been found on cetaceans (including porpoises, dolphins, beaked whales, sperm whales and baleen whales), pinnipeds (including fur seals, leopard seals and elephant seals), dugongs, sharks (including blue sharks, goblin sharks, basking sharks, great white sharks, megamouth sharks and smalltooth sand tiger sharks), stingrays (including deepwater stingrays, pelagic stingrays and sixgill stingrays), and bony fishes (including billfishes, tunas, dolphinfishes, jacks, escolars, opahs, and pomfrets).

The prevalence of these attacks can be high: off Hawaii, nearly every adult spinner dolphin bears scars from this species. Diseased or otherwise weakened animals appear to be more susceptible, and in the western Atlantic observations have been made of emaciated beached melon-headed whales with dozens to hundreds of recent and healing cookiecutter shark wounds, while such wounds are rare on nonemaciated beached whales. The impact of parasitism on prey species, in terms of resources diverted from growth or reproduction, is uncertain.

The cookiecutter shark exhibits a number of specializations to its mouth and pharynx for its parasitic lifestyle. The shark first secures itself to the body surface of its prey by closing its spiracles and retracting its basihyal (tongue) to create pressure lower than that of the surroundings; its suctorial lips ensure a tight seal. It then bites, using its narrow upper teeth as anchors while its razor sharp lower teeth slice into the prey. Finally, the shark twists and rotates its body to complete a circular cut, quite possibly aided by the initial forward momentum and subsequent struggles of its prey. The action of the lower teeth may also be assisted by back-and-forth vibrations of the jaw, a mechanism akin to that of an electric carving knife. This shark's ability to create strong suction into its mouth is likely also of use in capturing smaller prey such as squid.

Life history
Like other dogfish sharks, the cookiecutter shark is aplacental viviparous, with the developing embryos being sustained by yolk until birth. Females have two functional uteri and give birth to litters of 6 to 12 pups. The embryos had developed brown pigmentation, but not the dark collar or differentiated dentition.

Human interactions

Favoring offshore waters and thus seldom encountered by humans, the cookiecutter shark is not considered dangerous because of its small size. However, it has been implicated in a few attacks; in one case, a school of 30-cm (12 in) long fish with blunt snouts attacked an underwater photographer on an open-ocean dive. Similar reports have come from shipwreck survivors, of suffering small, clean, deep bites during night time. In March 2009, Maui resident Mike Spalding was bitten by a cookiecutter shark while swimming across Alenuihaha Channel. Swimmer Eric Schall was bitten by a cookiecutter shark March 31, 2019 while crossing the Kaiwi Channel and suffered a large laceration to his stomach. A second cookiecutter attack occurred in the same spot three weeks later. Isaiah Mojica was attempting the channel swim April 6, 2019 as part of the Oceans Seven challenge when he was bitten on the left shoulder. A third person attempting to complete the swim was bitten in nearly the same area of the channel. Adherbal Treidler de Oliveira was attempting the swim July 29, 2019, when he was bitten once on the stomach and then a second time on the left thigh. Two of the three swimmers were using electrical shark deterrents which did not deter the sharks. In 2017, a seven year old boy, Jack Tolley, was bitten in the leg while wading in Alma Bay in North Queensland with his family. The shark caused a 7.3 cm wound that was nearly down to the bone. On February 9, 2022, a deepwater swimmer was off Kailua-Kona, Hawaii, when they were bitten on the right foot and calf.  There are several records of bodies recovered from the water with post-mortem cookiecutter shark bites.

During the 1970s, several U.S. Navy submarines were forced back to base to repair damage caused by cookiecutter shark bites to the neoprene boots of their AN/BQR-19 sonar domes, which caused the sound-transmitting oil inside to leak and impaired navigation. An unknown enemy weapon was initially feared, before this shark was identified as the culprit, and the problem was solved by installing fiberglass covers around the domes. In the 1980s, some 30 U.S. Navy submarines were damaged by cookiecutter shark bites, mostly to the rubber-sheathed electric cable leading to the sounding probe used to ensure safety when surfacing in shipping zones. Again, the solution was to apply a fiberglass coating. Oceanographic equipment and telecommunications cables have also been damaged by this species.

The harm inflicted by cookiecutter sharks on fishing nets and economically important species may have a minor negative effect on commercial fisheries. The shark itself is too small to be of value, and is only infrequently taken, as bycatch, on pelagic longlines and in midwater trawls and plankton nets. The lack of significant population threats, coupled with a worldwide distribution, has led the IUCN to assess the cookiecutter shark as of least concern. In June 2018 the New Zealand Department of Conservation classified the cookiecutter shark as "Not Threatened" with the qualifier "Secure Overseas" under the New Zealand Threat Classification System.

References

Isistius
Bioluminescent sharks
Parasitic vertebrates
Fish described in 1824